Detective in the House is an American procedural drama television series that aired on CBS on Friday nights from March 15, 1985 to April 19, 1985. This series was a midseason replacement for The Dukes of Hazzard.

Premise
Press Wyman, a successful engineer, becomes a private detective with the assistance of retired PI Nick Turner.

Cast
Judd Hirsch as Press Wyman
Jack Elam as Nick Turner
Cassie Yates as Diane Wyman
Amanda Ingber as Deborah Wyman
Meeno Peluce as Todd Wyman
R.J. Williams as Dunc Wyman

Episodes

References

External links
 

1985 American television series debuts
1985 American television series endings
CBS original programming
English-language television shows
Television shows set in Colorado
Television series by Lorimar Television